Events from the year 1720 in Canada.

Incumbents
French Monarch: Louis XV
British and Irish Monarch: George I

Governors
Governor General of New France: Philippe de Rigaud Vaudreuil
Colonial Governor of Louisiana: Jean-Baptiste Le Moyne de Bienville
Governor of Nova Scotia: John Doucett
Governor of Placentia: Samuel Gledhill

Events
 1720-60 - The Chickasaw fight the French and the Choctaw in the Southeast.
 c. 1720: French forts along the Mississippi River spread northward from New Orleans.
 To compensate for their loss, the French build a fortress at Louisbourg on the southeast tip of Cape Breton Island.

Births

Deaths

Historical documents
"A Hundred Pieces of Cannon fired together" - Ship crossing Grand Banks draws St. Elmo's Fire before fierce lightning storm

St. John's merchants include "litle pedlers" who reduce indebted planters "to a servant, and soon after to slavery for life"

Extensive piracy is committed in Newfoundland's Trepassey and St. Mary's harbours because road for sending help still not built

Newfoundlander William Keen requests full judicial authority to address "evills and outrages dayly committed in this place"

Nova Scotia governor urges Acadians to take oath of allegiance to King, who has preserved their civil and religious rights

Acadians residing in Nova Scotia appeal to Île-Royale (Cape Breton Island) leader for advice and assistance

"Demands we cannot agree to" - Acadians tell Governor Philipps they cannot take oath because they fear "savages" will retaliate

Nova Scotia described in its mineral and agricultural potential, its settlements and people (Note: "savage" and other racial stereotypes)

References

 
Canada
20